Nigel Shaw is a Canadian Anglican Bishop.

Shaw was educated at the University of Toronto; and ordained in 1985. He was a Chaplain with the Canadian Armed Forces from 1986 until his election as Bishop of the Anglican Military Ordinariate in 2016.

References

Living people
University of Toronto alumni
21st-century Anglican Church of Canada bishops
Canadian military chaplains
Year of birth missing (living people)